is a 2013 Japanese animated drama thriller film part of the film series based on the Case Closed manga and anime series. The film aired on April 19, 2014 on Nippon TV as well. Its theme song is "One More Time" by Kazuyoshi Saito.

Plot

Introduction
At Maizuru Bay, on the dawn of April 20, a coast guard named Masaki Kurata finds a suspicious boat during his patrol. Upon examining the inside of the boat, he discovers some explosives and immediately reports this to the Wakasa Coast Guard. The discovery quickly hits the news reports, where is it revealed that the boat contains data and components not found in Japan. It's also believed to have entered Japan illegally.

The military exercises
On the same morning, Conan Edogawa, Ran and Kogoro Mori, Sonoko Suzuki and the Detective Boys board an Atago Class destroyer, JDS Hotaka, to experience public military exercises after winning the tickets. Before going aboard, Conan receives a call from Professor Agasa, who's currently in Osaka together with Ai Haibara for a conference, via the newly added satellite-phone on his Stun-Gun Wristwatch. The professor wants to test if the new gadget is working properly, but doesn't forget to leave a quiz for the children before hanging up.

After boarding the ship, the participants are gathered in a meeting room. While the Chief Navigator Fumitada Inoue is explaining about the exercise schedule, Ran mentions that her watch was broken and sent to be repaired. Mitsuhiko then lends her his waterproof radio-controlled watch, which sets itself at 5 AM and 5 PM every day according to radio transmitters. Suddenly, they hear a strange loud sound. Fumitada explains that it was just the sound of the pumping system operating, however, Conan wonders whether that was really the case.

Meeting Yuuki and Nanami
The participants are guided into the ship's Combat Information Center (CIC), where they are to witness a simulated anti-air combat. However, after having "shot down" the two set-up targets, the guards continue to detect a sonar response. An unidentified target of unknown nationality is slowly approaching the ship. The tactical action officer quickly reports this to their captain, Yukio Tateishi, who orders them to search for the target with all radars, before heading to the CIC himself. Following him is a female Self-Defense Force (SDF) member, Nanami Fuji. The civilian participants are generally impressed by the realistic and tense atmosphere of the training; only Conan realizes that they're truly under attack. Yukio instructs the crews to prepare for anti-submarine combat. They decide to fire a torpedo towards the unknown object. The ship is slightly hit with the shockwave caused by the impact. Conan then notices a sick boy with no accompanying adult. The crews are relieved that their target is nothing but a shipwreck. Fumitada announces to the participants that the "exercises" are now over.

The participants arrive at the deck during free time. Conan sees the boy from before, who is called "Yuki-kun" by a man nearby. Conan wonders if the man is Yuki's father, and finds it suspicious that he didn't notice the shock, and wouldn't show himself until after the free time had started. He decides to follow the two, only to be stopped by Kogoro. Conan then notices the female SDF member, Nanami Fuji, who's also on the deck at the time. Conan borrows Mitsuhiko's camera and begs Nanami to take a group photo with them, attempting to get a close-up shot of her. When asked about her specific work on the ship, Nanami answers that she only cooks everyone's meal, a lie that Conan can easily perceive due to her captain-ranked insignia. Before Nanami leaves, Kogoro reaches for one of his flashy business cards as he wants to hand it to her himself. Unfortunately, the detective's clumsiness causes the cards to fly all around them. They have to pick the cards up and give them to Ran.

Conan borrows Mitsuhiko's camera again and runs off to a corner. He gives Agasa a call via the satellite-phone and asks him to investigate Nanami basing on the picture that he sent to Haibara's phone, specifically from which department does the SDF member come from. The ship crews detect a satellite transmission from the right side of the deck, where Conan was calling Agasa. They suspect that "X" is among the civilians. When one of the guides is introducing the ship's radar which can cover over 450 km, Conan sees some crew members checking his previous hiding spot. He wonders whether they have found out about the call, or it was actually something else.

Discovering the arm and its owner
Conan plans to chase after the crew members with the excuse of "going to the toilet", but Ran doesn't trust him and suggests that the two go together. On the way, Ran mentions that she almost got lost earlier, which reminds Conan that Ran isn't always good with directions. He remembers the time when Ran also got lost at Tropical Land. However, she wasn't afraid of getting lost again, because she knew that Shinichi would always find her, as he's a great detective; to which Shinichi replied: "Don't you worry! I'll always find you, wherever you are."

Unsurprising to Conan, Ran gets lost again as their path was blocked with a forbidden sign. Suddenly, they hear a scream coming from a room beyond the limit. Upon arriving, they see a human arm wearing a SDF's lieutenant uniform on the table. They advise the crew members to consult Kogoro.

In Osaka, Heiji Hattori gets a call from Conan, who informs him of the situation. He, together with Kazuha Toyama, heads off to Maizuru. The ship crews detect Conan's satellite signal again but don't find any transmitter. It is then that he learns of the person with the codename "X". Unfortunately, Conan's phone rings again as he receives a call from Agasa, who's about to inform him that their search for Nanami didn't find any match. However, he manages to hide before the crew members discover him. Conan then looks for a different method of communication, and he comes across a room with a strong magnetic field.

Meanwhile, inside the bridge, Hotaka's Captain Yukio Tateishi and Captain Makoto Sekiguchi from the Wakasa Military Police discuss the case with Kogoro and Ran. Kogoro deduces that the arm wasn't cut off by a sharp blade and was removed post-mortem. As it was found inside the pumping system's filter, they conclude that the arm was sucked in by the pumping system and got stuck in the filter, making the loud sound from earlier. Yukio hesitantly reveals that the arm probably belongs to Lt. Sasaura from the Wakasa base, whose whereabouts is currently unknown. Kogoro agrees with this assumption after seeing that his clock stopped at 5:30 AM that morning. According to Yukio, Sasaura wasn't in that day's shift. As the pumping system was started when they left Maizuru Harbor, Sasaura's body must have already drifted at the time. Fearing that it would be too late for an autopsy when they get back, Conan hints that they use the helicopter to transport the arm, pretending that it's only a demonstration. Kogoro then informs Inspector Megure of the case, not knowing that Nanami is watching nearby.

Conan and Ran encounter Yuki when they come to watch the "demonstration", and notice that his father is missing again. Yuki doesn't want to let Ran tell the crews about his situation and attempts to run away before dropping some medicines. He reveals that they are for food allergies. Just as he's about to leave, Yuki's father appears. Conan comes to the magnetic room and contacts Agasa, in order to avoid being discovered. Haibara tells him about her discovery. Meanwhile, at a shipyard in Wakasa Bay, Heiji and Kazuha find Sasaura's body. Heiji notices a red stain on Sasaura's neck and secretly retrieves it.

Initial investigation
Inspector Megure, Miwako Sato, Wataru Takagi and two officers from Wakasa Coast Guard, Masaki Kurata and Tsutomu Munekawa, arrive at the ship in a helicopter. Heiji informs Conan that he's found the body at Wakasa Bay. He surmises that Sasaura drifted there after having his arm swallowed at Maizuru Harbor. After hearing about the red stain, Conan asks Heiji to meet up with Agasa. While the civilians are having lunch, the police suggest an investigation on the ship, considering that the victim might have been sucked into the pump before the ship departed. Conan follows them to the deck, where they find Sasaura's phone. The last email was after 9 PM and the last call was at 5:30 AM. According to the autopsy, his death was between 4 AM and 6 AM and the cause of death is drowning, which means that he was on the ship before falling into the sea at 5:30 AM. Kogoro deduces that Sasaura had a fight with someone on the deck and was eventually pushed down. This also confirms that his body was stuck in the filter before the departure, and the arm was severed when they left Maizuru Harbor. Sato finds an empty microSD slot on the phone. Kogoro thinks that the card was the culprit's target. Conan then sees Nanami spying on the investigation and gives chase.

Nanami's mission and spy "X"
Nanami enters the captain's office and checks the content of the microSD card stolen from Sasaura's phone. Conan imitates the captain's voice to trick her out of the room. Conan finds out that she hasn't completely deleted the extracted data and attempts to copy them into the new USB flash drive on his watch. However, Nanami realizes that she was tricked and quickly makes her way back to the office, Conan is thus unable to retrieve all of the data. She wonders why X is interested in the data. To uncover her true identity, Conan deliberately sends the data to Agasa from within the room, creating a detectable satellite signal.

The police arrive at the captain's office. They demand that Nanami explain herself, but Yukio and Makoto refuse to cooperate. Conan then comes out and innocently points out all of the contradictory facts about Nanami, forcing her to reveal herself as a member of the Intelligence Security Command. Due to the incident with the foreign boat, they suspect that the spy X, whose target is believed to be classified intel on Aegis Destroyers, might be on board. It's also revealed that the victim was the Director of Intelligence for the Wakasa SDF base. His duty was to guard information on Aegis Destroyers. Because of this, they suspect that X was the killer. Conan wonders why Nanami doesn't talk about the card. He plants a bug on Kogoro before running off.

Investigation on the victim
Conan asks Heiji, who's now inside Agasa's car, about the red stain. They learn that it's anti-fouling paint, a special paint used for ships. Conan asks them to check if the paint was from Hotaka. Heiji says that there is no current that could've sent the victim's body from Maizuru Harbor to Wakasa Bay. Conan then asks about the data from earlier, about which Agasa reveals that it's indeed a data of Aegis Destroyers, and was copied from a cloud service. If they have the ID and password, they can get the original data from the cloud. Conan wonders why would Sasaura store such important data on a public cloud service. He instructs Agasa to access the cloud data and send it to the captain's office.

Back in the captain's office, Kogoro asks Inspector Fumimaro Ayanokoji, who's just arrived, to share the result of his investigation. Having investigated the victim's actions before his death, Fumimaro reveals that at 5:30 AM, Sasaura was waving a Japanese flag on a cliff at Maizuru Harbor, as witnessed by a crew member of a sightseeing cruise nearby. He then asks Makoto about the interrogation of Sasaura, but Nanami doesn't let the latter answer. Luckily, Agasa sends the data as instructed, forcing Makoto to reveal that data about the ships have been leaked by Sasaura, and sent to a shell company of a spy called Takekawa. This, together with the suspicious boat, indicates that a spy from the same country as Takekawa attempted to board this ship with the victim's help. It also explains Nanami's motive for taking the memory card. Nanami contacts her superior, and learns that Takekawa has been spotted in Kyoto. His plan is to meet up with X, who's currently on board. They then work together to track down Takekawa.

Takekawa's whereabouts and the truth behind the shipwreck
Components from the same country as the ones in the foreign boat was found on the shipwreck. As the sailing route of the ship was changed from right to left that morning and only people from the Wakasa base knew about this, X wouldn't have known the true direction to send out the shipwreck. However, the flag that Sasaura waved turns out to be a signal flag, the purpose of which was to inform X of the change. Nanami becomes suspicious of Conan's knowledge.

Takekawa was spotted at 12:03 PM in Ponto Town Park (Kyoto), where he's shown dropping something into a trash can. Conan asks Heiji to go to the park before the police do. At 12:10 PM, Takekawa got on an express train to Osaka. They then ask the Osaka Police to cooperate.

Heiji manages to catch up before the police arrive and takes a photo of Takekawa's burned memo.

Back at the cafeteria, Conan revises the whole case and realizes X's motive for sending the shipwreck. Unexpectedly, Nanami approaches him and questions about his identity. Without telling her the truth, Conan drops his façade and directly asks Nanami whether there is any kind of data that can only be obtained on the ship. Nanami confirms his theory and says that the only two places where such data can be found are the CIC and captain's office. Conan deduces that during the emergency, the captain had to come to the CIC; that's when X made his move in the captain's office. He now realizes who X is and quickly runs off, with Nanami and Ran chasing behind. Makoto then informs Nanami that they spotted Takekawa at Yodoyabashi Station (Osaka). Conan tells Heiji to go after him, while he confronts X himself.

X's true identity
The man who claims to be Yuki Amemiya's father is spy X. Conan tells Yuki to hide away before exposing that the man's not his real father. X attempts to silence Conan, but then flees because there are too many civilians on the deck. Conan gives chase, but Yuki, fearing about his real father's safety, intervenes. Meanwhile, after examining the picture of Takekawa's burned memo, Heiji concludes that Takekawa will come to Senshu Airport (now known as Kansai International Airport). He reports this to Inspector Goro Otaki.

Conan tells the police that Yuki's father vanished at Maizuru Harbor, where Yuki was forced to board with a strange man. Because Conan also remembers X's face, they invite him to check the camera footage. The Osaka police head to Kansai Airport in chase of Takekawa.

X destroys the footage before Conan can locate him. Yuki wants to help them catch X, so Fumitada goes together with him, only to be assaulted by the spy. X takes Yuuki to the deck and are spotted by Ran, who's looking for Conan. Yuki tells Ran about X's true identity. Ran fights X, but is eventually defeated and thrown into the sea.

At Kansai Airport, Kazuha finds Takekawa and tries to catch him. She chases him to a dead end. Takekawa shoots Kazuha, but Heiji jumps in and takes the bullet for her. Luckily, Otaki arrives just in time to stop Takekawa. Kazuha cries even though Heiji's not fatally wounded.

Meanwhile, Yuki leads the police to X. While Miwako and the others chase X, Conan instructs Nanami to ambush on the deck. X takes a crew member hostage. Conan tells Nanami to rotate the cannon counter clockwise. Before X manages to escape, Conan uses the setting to kick a ball at him and knocks out the spy.

After the two spies are captured, they discover a suspicious voice-mail sent by Sasaura to Takekawa, which was recorded at 5:30 AM. Conan hears sounds of waves, some metallic clicking sounds and a man's voice in the record. Agasa calls him to inform that the paint wasn't from Hotaka, but from a sightseeing cruise, which left Maizuru Harbor and passed by Wakasa Shipyard. Conan deduces that the victim's body was dragged along the cruise from Maizuru Harbor to Wakasa Harbor. After revising all of the evidence he has gathered, Conan realizes he has been misled.

The deduction

Conan races back to the CIC bridge, where the military and police believe that the case has been solved. Conan knocks out Mori with his stun gun wristwatch and using Mori, explains the truth about who murdered Sasaura. He points out that Sasaura's phone that Nanami had found earlier was a fake piece of evidence designed to throw off the investigators. That means that the killer boarded the Aegis destroyer midway through the investigation to plant the evidence. He reveals Kurata to be the person that killed Sasaura, using evidence from an audio file of a conversation made by Sasaura of the metallic clinking sounds to be the sound when Kurata's expandable baton struck his gun when he walked.

Realizing he's been caught, Kurata turns in his baton and gun, and reveals the whole reason why he's been covering up the death of Sasaura. In reality, Kurata first stumbled upon Sasaura when he was making his phone call to X, and after a foot chase and struggle, Sasaura accidentally fell into the sea when the rock he had been running on gave way. Later, he discovered the suspicious ship and then reported it to the JSMDF. After learning of Sasaura's arm being found, he realized Sasaura was the one that had died. He decided to request to be part of the investigation team in order to try to cover up his crime. He then planted Sasaura's phone to try to throw off the investigators. He is then arrested by the police for interfering with the investigation.

Rescuing Ran

The Detective Boys, Yuki, and Sonoko suddenly rush into the CIC bridge, frantically shouting that Ran has been missing for a while. The police also reveal an important piece of news they had learned from the interrogation of X, in that X admitted he had thrown a high school aged girl proficient in karate overboard during a struggle. Realizing that it's Ran, the destroyer makes a 180 degree turn back to where they think Ran is located. But with the waves getting stronger and the sun going down, chances are slim they will be able to locate Ran. They try their best by sending out a helicopter to go investigate, but they are unable to locate Ran and everyone starts losing hope that they'll find Ran, with some breaking into tears.

Conan, who initially was shocked at Ran's disappearance, suddenly remembers that she is wearing a radio waterproof watch. Using Conan's advice, they use the destroyer's radar to try to track the location of Ran. However, even that appears to be not working. Conan has a flashback to the day he was last with Ran in Tropical Land and screams out her name in anguish.

Suddenly, the destroyer's radar manages to pick up Ran's signal, and the helicopter races over to her location. But with it being nearly dark, the helicopter has difficulty locating her. Conan remembers that Ran was carrying all of Mori's business cards, which are reflective, and tells the helicopter to follow the glittering business cards scattered in the sea. Eventually they manage to locate her, and pull her out of the sea in near shock but alive.

With Ran rescued, the destroyer finally heads back to the port. As Conan begins to leave, Nanami asks him who he really is. Conan innocently states that he's just a typical elementary school aged student, and runs off, leaving Nanami to ponder.

Cast
Minami Takayama as Conan Edogawa
Wakana Yamazaki as Ran Mori
Rikiya Koyama as Kogoro Mori
Kappei Yamaguchi as Shinichi Kudo
Ryō Horikawa as Heiji Hattori
Yuko Miyamura as Kazuha Toyama
Ken'ichi Ogata as Hiroshi Agasa
Megumi Hayashibara as Ai Haibara
Yukiko Iwai as Ayumi Yoshida
Ikue Ōtani as Mitsuhiko Tsuburaya
Wataru Takagi as Genta Kojima
Naoko Matsui as Sonoko Suzuki
Ryōtarō Okiayu as Fumimaro Ayanokoji
Takaya Kuroda as The Spy X
Ko Shibasaki as Nanami Fuji

Soundtrack
The film's soundtrack titled  contains 75 songs from the film's score and was released on April 17, 2013.

Reception
In the Japanese Box Office, the film earned a total of 3,572,987,671 yen (US$35,311,837) across 210 theatres and became the franchise's highest-grossing film at the box office. It was the 7th highest-grossing film of the year in the country.

Yahoo! Japan, which opens the films to different critics, ranked the film with a 3.60 rank star out of five stars.

References

External links
 
Official NTV website  

2013 anime films
TMS Entertainment
Toho animated films
Private Eye in the Distant Sea
2010s Japanese-language films
Japan Self-Defense Forces in fiction
Films with screenplays by Takeharu Sakurai